The 1931 International Lawn Tennis Challenge was the 26th edition of what is now known as the Davis Cup. 

Due to an increase in South American entries, the America Zone was split into the North & Central America Zone and the South America Zone, with the winner of each sub-zone playing to determine who moved to the Inter-Zonal round. 22 teams would enter the Europe Zone, while 8 would enter the America Zone. These included first-time entries from Brazil, Paraguay and Uruguay, although Brazil withdrew without playing a tie, and Paraguay would not play in the Davis Cup again until 1982. This year also marked the first time that ties were played in South America.

The United States defeated Argentina in the America Inter-Zonal Final, but would then lose to Great Britain in the Inter-Zonal play-off. France defeated Great Britain in the Challenge Round, giving France their fifth straight title. The final was played at Stade Roland Garros in Paris, France on 24–26 July.

America Zone

North & Central America Zone

South America Zone

Americas Inter-Zonal Final
United States vs. Argentina

Europe Zone

Draw

Final
Czechoslovakia vs. Great Britain

Inter-Zonal Final
Great Britain vs. United States

Challenge Round
France vs. Great Britain

See also
 1931 Wightman Cup

References

External links
Davis Cup official website

Davis Cups by year
 
International Lawn Tennis Challenge
International Lawn Tennis Challenge
International Lawn Tennis Challenge
International Lawn Tennis Challenge